The following is an alphabetical list of topics related to the nation of Saint Vincent and the Grenadines.

0–9 

.vc – Internet country code top-level domain for Saint Vincent and the Grenadines

A
Americas
North America
North Atlantic Ocean
West Indies
Caribbean Sea
Antilles
Lesser Antilles
Islands of Saint Vincent and the Grenadines
Anglo-America
Antilles
Atlas of Saint Vincent and the Grenadines

B

C
Capital of Saint Vincent and the Grenadines:  Kingstown on Saint Vincent
Caribbean
Caribbean Community (CARICOM)
Caribbean Sea
Categories:
:Category:Saint Vincent and the Grenadines
:Category:Buildings and structures in Saint Vincent and the Grenadines
:Category:Communications in Saint Vincent and the Grenadines
:Category:Economy of Saint Vincent and the Grenadines
:Category:Education in Saint Vincent and the Grenadines
:Category:Environment of Saint Vincent and the Grenadines
:Category:Geography of Saint Vincent and the Grenadines
:Category:Government of Saint Vincent and the Grenadines
:Category:History of Saint Vincent and the Grenadines
:Category:Military of Saint Vincent and the Grenadines
:Category:Politics of Saint Vincent and the Grenadines
:Category:Saint Vincent and the Grenadines stubs
:Category:Saint Vincent and the Grenadines-related lists
:Category:Sport in Saint Vincent and the Grenadines
:Category:Transport in Saint Vincent and the Grenadines
:Category:Vincentian culture
:Category:Vincentian people
:Category:Vincentian society
commons:Category:Saint Vincent and the Grenadines
Coat of arms of Saint Vincent and the Grenadines
Commonwealth of Nations
Commonwealth realm of Saint Vincent and the Grenadines
Communications in Saint Vincent and the Grenadines
Cricket in the West Indies

D
Demographics of Saint Vincent and the Grenadines

E
Economy of Saint Vincent and the Grenadines
Electric power in Saint Vincent and the Grenadines
English colonization of the Americas
English language

F

Flag of Saint Vincent and the Grenadines
Foreign relations of Saint Vincent and the Grenadines

G
Geography of Saint Vincent and the Grenadines

H
History of Saint Vincent and the Grenadines

I
International Organization for Standardization (ISO)
ISO 3166-1 alpha-2 country code for Saint Vincent and the Grenadines: VC
ISO 3166-1 alpha-3 country code for Saint Vincent and the Grenadines: VCT
ISO 3166-2:VC region codes for Saint Vincent and the Grenadines
Islands of Saint Vincent and the Grenadines:
Saint Vincent (island)
All Awash Island
Baliceaux Island
Battowia Island
Bequia
Canouan Island
Catholic Island
Chateaubelair Island
Church Cay
Cow And Calves Islands
Dike Island
Dove Cay
Dove Island
Duvernette Islet
Frigate Island, Grenadines
L'Islot
Mayreau
Milligan Cay
Mustique
Nevis Island
Palm Island, Grenadines
Petit Cannouan
Petit Cay
Petit Mustique
Petit Nevis
Petit Saint Vincent
Petit Tabac
Pigeon Island, Grenadines
Pillories, Grenadines
Quatre Isle
Rabbit Island, Grenadines
Red Island, Grenadines
Saint Elairs Cay
Sand Cay, Grenadines
Savan Island
Tobago Cays
Union Island
Young Island, Grenadines

J

K
Kevin Lyttle 
Kingstown on Saint Vincent – Capital of Saint Vincent and the Grenadines

L
LGBT rights in Saint Vincent and the Grenadines (Gay rights)
Lists related to Saint Vincent and the Grenadines:
Diplomatic missions of Saint Vincent and the Grenadines
List of cities in Saint Vincent and the Grenadines
List of diplomatic missions in Saint Vincent and the Grenadines
List of islands of Saint Vincent and the Grenadines
List of rivers of Saint Vincent and the Grenadines
List of Saint Vincent and the Grenadines-related topics
Topic outline of Saint Vincent and the Grenadines

M
Military of Saint Vincent and the Grenadines
Monarchy of Saint Vincent and the Grenadines
Music of Saint Vincent and the Grenadines

N

O
Organisation of Eastern Caribbean States (OECS)

P
People of Saint Vincent and the Grenadines
Politics of Saint Vincent and the Grenadines

Q

R
Regions of Saint Vincent and the Grenadines
Religion in Saint Vincent and the Grenadines

S
Saint Vincent and the Grenadines
The Scout Association of Saint Vincent and the Grenadines
Scouting in Saint Vincent and the Grenadines
States headed by Elizabeth II

T
Topic outline of Saint Vincent and the Grenadines
Transport in Saint Vincent and the Grenadines

U
United Nations, member state since 1980

V

W
Water supply and sanitation in Saint Vincent and the Grenadines
Wesley Charles

Wikipedia:WikiProject Topic outline/Drafts/Topic outline of Saint Vincent and the Grenadines

X

Y

Z

See also

Commonwealth of Nations
List of Caribbean-related topics
List of international rankings
Lists of country-related topics
Topic outline of geography
Topic outline of North America
Topic outline of Saint Vincent and the Grenadines
United Nations

References

External links

 
Saint Vincent and the Grenadines